Francis Gregory Stockdale (30 July 1899 – 14 May 1949) was an Australian rules footballer who played with Essendon in the Victorian Football League (VFL) during the 1920s.

Family
The son of William Hallett Stockdale (1859–1927), and Agnes Stockdale (-1925), née Heavy (or Heavey or Harvey), Francis Gregory Stockdale was born at Kilmore, Victoria on 30 July 1899.

One of his older brothers, William Hallett Stockdale (1887–1915), was killed in action at Gallipoli on 8 May 1915.

He married Ivy Gladys Lobb (1894–1947) in 1936.

Football

Kilmore (RDFA)
He played with the Kilmore Football Club in 1917 and 1918.

Rushworth (KDFL)
He played for Rushworth Football Club in the Kyabram and District Football League in 1919.

Corowa (O&MFA)
Stockdale moved to Corowa to work (at Stockdale & Skehan Motor Garage) and played football with his older brother, Chas Stockdale in the powerful Ovens and Murray Football League from 1920 to 1922. It was at Corowa Football Club that his football really started to excel. He was a member of Corowa's 1921 O&MFA grand final side that lost to Lake Rovers Football Club. Stockdale managed to play seven games with Essendon Football Club between 1920 and 1922, before moving down to Melbourne permanently after the 1922 O&MFA season to play with Essendon.

Essendon (VFL)
A left footer, Stockdale started his career at Essendon as a half back flanker in 1920. After playing a full season for Corowa in 1922, Stockdale played his first match for the season with Essendon in round 15, then played as a forward in the 1922 preliminary final, against Fitzroy on 7 October 1922. Playing at full-forward he kicked five of Essendon's six goals (Essendon lost the match 6.9 (45) to Fitzroy's 9.14 (68)) — one of them (in the third quarter) with his right foot. He remained a forward for most of his career.

In the first match of the 1923 season, against St Kilda, Stockdale kicked 10 goals. In the 1923 season he kicked 68 goals and was the VFL league's leading goalkicker, breaking the record for the most goals kicked by a player in a season. He was the Essendon's leading goalkicker in 1923 (68 goals), 1926 (36 goals), and 1928 (39 goals).

He won Essendon's Best and Fairest award in 1925; he was the team's vice-captain in 1928, and served as captain for one match in 1928. He represented Victoria in interstate football on 8 occasions (1923, 1925, 1927, and 1928).

VFL Tribunal
Stockdale was reported for striking South Melbourne's Bill Berryman in the third quarter of the 5 May 1928 match at Windy Hill. Having heard evidence that Stockdale had struck Berryman four times in the back the VFL Tribunal suspended Stockdale for eight matches.

Northcote (VFA)
Stockdale joined Northcote in the Victorian Football Association (VFA) in 1929, and played for three seasons (1929 to 1931). He was part of Northcote's first premiership side in 1929.

Coburg (VFA)
Although he was not released to Brunswick in 1931, he was cleared from Northcote in February 1932, Stockdale served as captain coach of Coburg for two seasons (1932 to 1933).

Death
He died at a private hospital in Kew, Victoria on 14 May 1949.

See also
 1927 Melbourne Carnival

Footnotes

References

External links 
 
 
 Greg Stockdale, at Boyles Football Photos.
 Greg Stockdale, at The VFA Project.
 Greg Stockdale action photo at training

1899 births
Australian rules footballers from Victoria (Australia)
Coburg Football Club players
Essendon Football Club players
Essendon Football Club Premiership players
Northcote Football Club players
Coburg Football Club coaches
Crichton Medal winners
VFL Leading Goalkicker Medal winners
1949 deaths
Two-time VFL/AFL Premiership players